"I'm Not Okay (I Promise)" is the lead single and fifth track from My Chemical Romance's second studio album, Three Cheers for Sweet Revenge. "I'm Not Okay (I Promise)" was released to radio on September 28, 2004. The song is also featured on the soundtrack of Burnout 3: Takedown.

Reception and accolades
It reached number 86 on the US Billboard Hot 100, and, in March 2005, number 19 on the UK Singles Chart. The song also helped expand the band's fan base, and has been certified Platinum by the Recording Industry Association of America. It was nominated for the Kerrang! Award for Best Single. The cover art was redone in live action on the inside of the band's DVD Life on the Murder Scene.

Music videos

The first music video version for the song features a montage of concert footage and the band's ordinary life in New Jersey. It was produced by Rafaela Monfradini and Greg Kaplan, who was also the director. It also features pictures of brothers, bassist Mikey Way and lead singer Gerard Way, when they were little kids and teenagers.

The second version music video depicts life inside a fictional American high school in the form of a mock movie trailer. The band appears as a group of outcast students who are repeatedly harassed by another group who are portrayed as popular kids. The band members then attempt to take on the popular kids and ultimately have a showdown in a hallway, with the band members armed with croquet mallets and the popular kids with lacrosse and hockey gear. It also has some clips expressing some emotions and clips of the band playing in a garage. The music video was directed by Marc Webb, and parts of it were filmed at Alexander Hamilton High School and Loyola High School in Los Angeles during August 2004. Greg Kaplan and Rafaelia Monfradini produced the video. The video started production on August 13, 2004. As of February 2022, the video has 90 million views on YouTube.

This version of the video was also named number one on Fuse's 25 Greatest Videos Countdown, beating out other videos such as "Basket Case" by Green Day and "Smells Like Teen Spirit" by Nirvana.

Cover versions
Matt Pond PA recorded a cover of the song for Engine Room Recordings' compilation album Guilt by Association Vol. 2, which was released in November 2008. The song is a part of American musical duo Twenty One Pilots' setlist for their 2021 Takeover Tour.

Track listing
All tracks written by My Chemical Romance.

US promotional DVD

UK promotional CD

UK CD1 and 7" vinyl

UK CD2

UK and Australian CD

UK re-release CD1 and iTunes single

UK re-release CD2

Credits and personnel
Gerard Way – lead and backing vocals
Ray Toro – lead guitar
Frank Iero – rhythm guitar
Mikey Way – bass guitar
Matt Pelissier – drums
Howard Benson – keyboards
Additional

Produced by Howard Benson
Mixed by Richard Costey and Simon Askew
Engineered and recorded by Dan Wise
Written by My Chemical Romance

Charts

Certifications

Release history

References

External links
 

2004 singles
My Chemical Romance songs
Music videos directed by Marc Webb
2004 songs
Songs written by Gerard Way
Song recordings produced by Howard Benson
Reprise Records singles